Hapik Bolagh (also Romanized as Hapīk Bolāghī; also known as Hāpī, Hapībolāghī, and Hapī Bolāghī) is a village in Gavdul-e Sharqi Rural District, in the Central District of Malekan County, East Azerbaijan Province, Iran. At the 2006 census, its population was 269, in 64 families.

References 

Populated places in Malekan County